The Saint Vrain Glaciers are small alpine glaciers located in Roosevelt National Forest in the U.S. state of Colorado. The glaciers are just south of Rocky Mountain National Park and east of the Continental Divide in northeast facing cirques.

See also
List of glaciers in the United States

References

Glaciers of Rocky Mountain National Park
Landforms of Boulder County, Colorado